The Peace Run is a global relay which promotes international friendship and understand, founded by Sri Chinmoy.

History

In 1987, Sri Chinmoy, founded  a run for international friendship, the Peace Run. The Liberty Torch Run, a relay to mark America's bicentennial in 1976, was the forerunner to this race. The Peace Run was initially held every two years and then annually. From 2005 to 2013 it was known under the name World Harmony Run. In June 2013 it returned to its previous name Peace Run. The team of international runners carry a torch as a symbol of friendship. The Peace Run has taken place in more than 100 countries. The aim of the torch run is to promote understanding and the harmonious relationship between the peoples of all nations, faiths and cultures. The Peace Run is a grassroots event and the international team meet with dignitaries, mayors, community groups and schools inviting them to participate by holding the peace torch and by making a step towards a more harmonious world. Past participants include Mother Teresa, Nelson Mandela and Mikhail Gorbachev who supported the run and held the peace torch. Nine time Olympic Carl Lewis is a spokesman for the Peace Run.

Song
An official theme song "Oneness-Home" was composed by Narada Michael Walden and recorded by Whitney Houston.

Routes

Some examples of routes or its parts:
  2006   Uganda: Kampala - Jinja, Uganda
  2007   Bulgaria, : Sofia - Montana, Bulgaria 
  2008   Indonesia, : Jakarta
  2008   United States, : Mancos - Bluff, Utah and Pagosa Springs, Colorado - Hesperus, Colorado
  2008   Poland, : Szczecin - Stargard Szczeciński - Koszalin - Słupsk - Kościerzyna - Wejherowo - Gdańsk

References

External links

Peace Run Official site
Video: Dr. Hepburn 
Video: WHR Australia 

Torch relays
Recurring events established in 1987
Sports events founded by Sri Chinmoy